Eva Mariana Espejo Pinzón (born 6 January 1986) is a Mexican professional football manager. She is currently the manager of Liga MX Femenil club Monterrey.

Managerial career

Pachuca Femenil

2017
In April 2017, Espejo was appointed as the first ever manager of Club Pachuca Femenil.
Her first match as the club's new manager took place on 3 May 2017, when Pachuca beat Chivas de Guadalajara
6–1 in the 2017 Copa MX Femenil. Espejo's team then defeated Morelia and Toluca respectively to advance to the final where they became the first ever Cup Champions after defeating Club Tijuana 9–1.

On 28 July 2017, Eva and her team inaugurated the Liga MX Femenil defeating Club Universidad Nacional 3–0 in the first ever women's league match, which took place in the Hidalgo Stadium.
On August 19, they defeated Cruz Azul 1–9 in the Azul Stadium, creating a new biggest-away-win record in the League.
On November 6, Pachuca defeated Tigres UANL 4–0 in the first leg of the semi-final. Five days later, Pachuca lost the second leg 3–0 that ended with a 4–3 aggregate score that would let Eva Espejo advance to the first-ever League final. On November 20, Pachuca hosted the first leg of the final against Chivas de Guadalajara which ended with a favorable score of 2–0 and on November 24 Pachuca lost the second leg 3–0 which ended in a 3–2 ending with Pachuca's hope to become the first ever league champions.

On November 22, Eva Espejo was nominated for the 2017 Women's Football Coach of the Year award by CONCACAF. On December 19, she was named the best coach of the year.

2020

On February 10, 2020, Eva Espejo reached 100 matches as head coach of Pachuca.

Career statistics

Managerial statistics

Honours and Achievements

Manager

Club
 Pachuca Femenil
 Copa MX Femenil: 2017

 Monterrey Femenil
 Liga MX Femenil: Apertura 2021

Individual
 CONCACAF Coach of the Year: 2017

References

1986 births
Living people
Sportspeople from Mexico City
Mexican football managers
Liga MX Femenil managers